Early Morning Hymns is the first album released by indie folk rock band Old Canes, released in 2004. They have drawn comparisons from many fans to now-defunct indie rock group Neutral Milk Hotel.

Track listing 

Intro – 0:16
Blue Eleanor – 3:17
Taxi On Vermont – 2:35
Both Falling Bright – 3:04
Life Is Grand – 2:58
Early Morning Hymns – 3:08
The Song Was Right – 3:37
Then Go On – 4:20
Face It – 3:16
One Day – 2:59
Untitled – 0:37
7th Fret Closer – 4:15

Trivia 

The track "Then Go On" was used in episode 4 of the popular FX television series Sons of Anarchy.

Old Canes albums
2004 debut albums